Dieter Neuendorf (7 July 1940 – 21 May 2021) was an East German ski jumper who competed in the mid-1960s. He won a silver medal in the individual normal hill at the 1966 FIS Nordic World Ski Championships in Oslo.

Neuendorf was born in Ruhla in July 1940. His best finish at the Winter Olympics was 5th in the individual normal hill at Innsbruck in 1964. He also won the ski jump event at the Holmenkollen ski festival in 1965.

He died on 21 May 2021, at the age of 80.

References 

 
 Holmenkollen winners since 1892 – click Vinnere for downloadable pdf file 

1940 births
2021 deaths
People from Ruhla
German male ski jumpers
Ski jumpers at the 1964 Winter Olympics
Ski jumpers at the 1968 Winter Olympics
Olympic ski jumpers of the United Team of Germany
Olympic ski jumpers of East Germany
Holmenkollen Ski Festival winners
FIS Nordic World Ski Championships medalists in ski jumping
Sportspeople from Thuringia